William Lusk McAllester (December 29, 1888 – March 3, 1970) was a catcher in Major League Baseball. He played for the St. Louis Browns in 1913.

Head coaching record

References

External links
 
 

1888 births
1970 deaths
Major League Baseball catchers
St. Louis Browns players
Montgomery Billikens players
Montgomery Rebels players
Chattanooga Mocs baseball players
Chattanooga Mocs football coaches
Chattanooga Mocs football players
Baseball players from Tennessee
People from Chattanooga, Tennessee